"Babylon" or "The Bonnie Banks o Fordie" is Child ballad 14, Roud 27.

Synopsis
An outlaw comes upon three sisters in the woods.  He threatens each one in turn to make her marry him.  The first two refuse and are killed.  The third threatens him with her brother or brothers.  He asks after them and discovers that he is the brother.  He commits suicide.

Parallels
Forms of this ballad are known throughout all of Scandinavia ("Töres döttrar i Wänge").

Recordings

Traditional recordings 
Betsy Miller of Scotland sang a traditional version of the song, presumably learnt from her Scottish family or community, with her famous son Ewan MacColl on the 1960 album A Garland Of Scots Folksong; only three other Scottish recordings were made. Helen Hartness Fladers recorded several traditional versions in the New England region of the United States, and Kenneth Peacock recorded two Canadian versions (1951 and 1960).

Popular recordings 
Following are some of the notable recordings of the ballad, including the artists, titles, albums, and years:

In Art

The artist Charles Hodge Mackie contributed the woodblock illustration By the Bonnie Banks o' Fordie to The Evergreen: A Northern Seasonal, The Book of Winter, published by Patrick Geddes and Colleagues in 1896.  He had painted an oil on board sketch of this subject while in France in the summer of 1894.  The woodblock composition was subsequently worked up as an oil painting which was exhibited at the Royal Scottish Academy in 1897.

See also
List of the Child Ballads
The King's Dochter Lady Jean
The Bonny Hind

References

External links

Bonny Farday, an American variant
The Bonnie Banks o Fordie with music and commentary

Child Ballads
Sororicide in fiction
Fiction about suicide
Murder ballads
Year of song unknown
Songwriter unknown